The 2021 Solomon Islands unrest was a series of demonstrations and violent riots in Solomon Islands from 24 to 27 November 2021.

It started off as a peaceful protest against the government's decision to recognize China over Taiwan. However, it turned out violent as protesters attempted to storm Parliament to depose Prime Minister Sogavare. Businesses, mainly in Honiara's Chinatown district, were burnt and looted. A police station was set on fire.

The government responded by deploying the police in which they used tear gas on the protesters. They also requested the Australian Government for support. As a result, Australia deployed the Australian Federal Police and Defence Force. Papua New Guinea and Fiji dispatched peacekeepers while New Zealand deployed police and troops.

Prime Minister Sogavare resisted calls to resign, saying that the decision is upon the floor of parliament. A no confidence motion was signed by an opposition member; however, it was defeated in parliament on 6 December 2021 as lawmakers voted to keep the Prime Minister in power.

Background 

Solomon Islands had historically been in a state of ethnic conflict until 2003, when Australia deployed a peacekeeping mission. The residents of Malaita, the nation's most populous island, have often complained that their island is neglected by the central government.

In 2019, the central government under Prime Minister Manasseh Sogavare withdrew recognition of the Republic of China (Taiwan) and established relations with the mainland People's Republic of China. Malaita Province, however, continued to be supported by Taiwan and the United States, the latter sending US$25 million of aid to the island in 2020. The premier of Malaita Province, Daniel Suidani, also held an independence referendum in 2020 which the national government has dismissed as illegitimate. Rising unemployment and poverty, worsened by the border closure during the COVID-19 pandemic, have also been cited as a cause of the unrest. Chinese businesses were also accused of giving jobs to foreigners instead of locals.

Events 
The protests were initially peaceful on 24 November, with members of the group "Malaita for Democracy" gathering to protest the Solomon Islands Government's decision to recognize China over Taiwan. They called on Prime Minister Sogavare to address them. After failing to meet with them, witnesses reported that protests turned violent. Protestors attempted to storm the parliament building to depose the Prime Minister. A 36-hour lockdown was issued, but was defied by protestors on 25 November, when a crowd took to the streets of Honiara's Chinatown. Buildings adjoining the Solomon Islands Parliament Building burnt to the ground. A police station and businesses were set on fire. Police fired upon protesters with tear gas.

Australia responded to the unrest on 25 November by deploying Australian Federal Police and Australian Defence Force personnel. They were requested by the Sogavare government under the Australia-Solomon Islands Bilateral Security Treaty. The Australian Government stated this deployment was to support the Royal Solomon Islands Police Force to maintain order and protect vital infrastructure and would take no position on the internal issues of Solomon Islands. Papua New Guinea agreed to send 34 peacekeepers to help staunch the violence.

By the morning of 27 November, the rioting had largely stopped, with police officers and peacekeeping troops patrolling the streets. Police later announced the discovery of three charred bodies in a burned building in Honiara's Chinatown district, as well as the arrest of over 100 people in relation to the riots.

Opposition leader Matthew Wale filed a no-confidence motion against the Sogavare government on 28 November, with debate scheduled for 6 December. The motion created a potential flashpoint for further unrest.

Fiji dispatched 50 troops on 30 November 2021. This was to reinforce the Australian Defence Force under the Vuvale Partnership between Australia and Fiji. 120 troops remained on standby in Fiji if needed. New Zealand sent 65 police and troops, with 15 personnel arriving 2 December, and 50 over the following weekend.

On 6 December, Sogavare survived a motion of no confidence in the National Parliament. 15 MPs voted in support, 32 voted against, and two abstained.

On 14 December, opposition figure John Kwaita was charged with instigating the unrest. The damage of the riots was estimated to be SI$500 million (NZ$91m). As a result of the economic turmoil, emergency supplies were delivered. By 22 December, military presence was scaled down in Honiara, but remained on standby to ensure stability. The Solomon Islands government requested assistance from China. The request was accepted by the Ministry of Foreign Affairs of the People's Republic of China on 24 December, resulting in batons, shields and helmets being supplied to the islands to help with quelling future riots.

Reactions

Domestic 
Prime minister Manasseh Sogavare warned the rioters would "face consequences", and resisted calls to resign, saying that if he would be removed, "it will be on the floor of Parliament". He also accused the protesters of being "politically motivated" and, during an interview with the Australian Broadcasting Corporation, blamed "foreign powers" for the unrest.

Opposition leader Matthew Wale and Malaita premier Daniel Suidani both called for Sogavare to step down, blaming him for the violence. However, both Wale and Suidani also condemned the violence on the part of the protesters. The premier of Guadalcanal Province Anthony Veke also strongly denounced the riots.

International 
The government of the People's Republic of China (PRC) expressed "concern about the attacks" and support for the Solomon Islands Government's attempts to "restore order and stability quickly".

Sogavare alleged that countries that did not want the Solomon Islands to establish ties with the People's Republic of China had fed the people of Malaita "false and deliberate lies" about Solomon Islands' shift in diplomatic relations from the ROC to the PRC. The spokesperson for the ROC foreign ministry, Joanne Ou, stated, "We have nothing to do with the unrest."

Australian prime minister Scott Morrison questioned whether Chinese citizens and businesses were targeted describing the unrest as a "mixed story". Australian foreign minister Marise Payne also stated that there was no indication that foreign countries had stirred up the unrest.

See also 

 China–Solomon Islands relations
 Solomon Islands–Taiwan relations
 Cross-Strait relations
 One-China policy
 Regional Assistance Mission to Solomon Islands

References 

2021 in the Solomon Islands
2021 protests
2021 riots
Conflicts in 2021
November 2021 events in Oceania
December 2021 events in Oceania
Protests in the Solomon Islands
Riots and civil disorder in Oceania
China–Solomon Islands relations
Solomon Islands–Taiwan relations
Cross-Strait relations
Australia–Solomon Islands relations
New Zealand–Solomon Islands relations
Fiji–Solomon Islands relations
Papua New Guinea–Solomon Islands relations
Military history of Australia
Military history of New Zealand
Military history of Fiji
Military history of Papua New Guinea
Anti-Chinese violence